List of lagoons of South Africa, A lagoon is a body of comparatively shallow salt or brackish water separated from the deeper sea by a shallow or exposed barrier beach, sandbank of marine origin, coral reef, or similar feature. Lagoon refers to both coastal lagoons formed by the build-up of sand

on slowly sinking central islands. Lagoons that are fed by freshwater streams are also called estuaries.
Following this, not all named Lagoons are therefore true. included in the list are all named lagoons.

The following is a partial list of Lagoons of South Africa.

List of Lagoons of South Africa

See also 
 List of estuaries of South Africa
 List of lakes in South Africa
 List of Bays of South Africa
 List of rivers of South Africa
 List of reservoirs and dams in South Africa

References 
  South African environment Department.

Lagoons